Peter Samuel Russo (born 13 September 1955) is an Australian politician. He is the Labor Party member for Toohey (formerly Sunnybank) in the Queensland Legislative Assembly since 2015.

Russo is currently the Chair of the Legal Affairs and Community Safety Committee. He has previously served as the Acting Chair of the Parliamentary Crime and Corruption Committee and Chair of the Finance and Administration Committee.

Prior to being elected, Russo was the Principal of Russo Lawyers and is admitted as a solicitor of the Supreme Courts of Queensland, New South Wales, and Western Australia and the High Court of Australia. He holds a Master of Laws from the Queensland University of Technology. He has been admitted for over 30 years, with particular focus in the area of criminal law. He is a past member of the Queensland Law Society Criminal Law Committee.

He was named The Australian newspaper's "Australian of the Year" in 2007. He has been involved in many high-profile cases, including representing Dr Mohamed Haneef in 2007 and 2008.

References

External links 

1955 births
Living people
Australian Labor Party members of the Parliament of Queensland
Members of the Queensland Legislative Assembly
20th-century Australian lawyers
People from Townsville
21st-century Australian politicians
21st-century Australian lawyers